Phaeosphaerella theae is a fungal plant pathogen infecting tea.

References

Fungal plant pathogens and diseases
Tea diseases
Pleosporales